The National Heads-Up Poker Championship was an annual poker tournament held in the United States and produced by the NBC television network.  It is a $25,000 "buy-in" invitation-only tournament organized as a series of one-on-one games of no limit Texas hold 'em matches.  The participants include many of the world's most successful poker players, as well as celebrities.

The championship was the first poker event to be televised on and produced by a major U.S. television network.

In October 2011, NBC announced that the National Heads-Up Poker Championship would not return in 2012, ending the championship's seven-year run. After a one-year hiatus, the tournament returned for a final time in 2013.
The $25,000 buy-in event ran from Jan. 24 through 26 at Caesars Palace, the same venue where the event was held from 2006 through 2011.

In February 2014, NBC announced the National Heads-Up Poker Championship would not return in 2014.

The Heads-Up Championship had been sponsored by online poker companies before Black Friday. The World Series of Poker (WSOP.com) is the new presenting sponsor.

Structure
The single-elimination tournament is modeled after college basketball tournaments. Players who win a match advance to the next round; the player who wins six matches is crowned champion.

The first round is seeded randomly the night before the tournament begins. Players are divided into four brackets – Clubs, Diamonds, Hearts, and Spades. A participant advances by winning a heads-up match against his or her randomly drawn opponent. The structure of the brackets then determines every match thereafter. The semifinals consist of one player from each bracket, with the winner of the Spades bracket playing the winner of the Clubs bracket, and the winner of the Hearts bracket matched up against the winner of the Diamonds bracket. A best-of-three final match then determines which of the two finalists is crowned champion.

Brief history
The National Heads-Up Poker Championship is an invitation-only event. In contrast, the World Heads-Up Poker Championship is an open event with a maximum participation of 128 players.

The 2005 event took place at the Golden Nugget Las Vegas between March 4 and March 6. It aired weekly on NBC from May 1 to May 22 with commentary from Gabe Kaplan and Matt Vasgersian.

The 2006 edition took place from March 4 to 6 at Caesars Palace in Las Vegas. NBC began its coverage by broadcasting one part of the opening round on April 16. The semi-final and championship matches aired May 21. Kaplan and Vasgersian returned as commentators.

The 2007 edition was broadcast from April 8 to May 20. Ali Nejad took Gabe Kaplan's spot as commentator due to Kaplan competing in the tournament.

Results

See also
Poker After Dark
High Stakes Poker
World Series of Poker

References

Poker tournaments
NBC original programming
Television shows about poker
Poker in North America